FC Zorky Krasnogorsk was a Russian women's football team from Krasnogorsk founded in 2006, competing in the Russian Championship. In 2012 it reached the national cup's final, lost to Zvezda Perm.

In its first top division season the team reached the runners-up spot in the league and thus qualified to the 2012–13 UEFA Women's Champions League.

History
The team entered competition on the third level of Russian women's football, the Second Division in 2008, and finished the season on fifth place. In 2009 they won that league by winning the division play-offs. In their initial First Division season in 2010 the team finished runners-up in the Western zone and then won play-off group B and then finally the final with a 1–0 win against Chertanovo Moskva.
They played the national top division in 2011–12 and secured a second-place position on the very last matchday, despite trailing Voroneh 13 points before the last ten games. The second position qualified them for the 2012–13 UEFA Women's Champions League, where they defeated Iceland's Stjarnan in the round of 32 on met defending champions Lyon in the round of 16.

Current squad
As of 7 October 2015

Honors
For a detailed international record see Russian women's football clubs in international competitions
 Russian Leagues champion: 2012–13
Russian Cup runners-up: 2012

References

External links
Official website  (Russian)
Soccerway profile

Women's football clubs in Russia
Association football clubs established in 2006
2006 establishments in Russia
Association football clubs disestablished in 2015
2015 disestablishments in Russia
Defunct football clubs in Russia